Powhite Creek is an  stream rising near the unincorporated community of Bon Air in Chesterfield County and flowing into the independent city of Richmond in central Virginia. The creek empties into the James River in the region of the Fall Line, where the rapids of the James are located upstream from the head of navigation.

The name is usually pronounced "PO-White" by area residents  although it is alternatively pronounced "Pow-Hite."  References to Powhite Creek are included in the Vestry Book of Henrico Parish, Virginia, 1730-1773, and in Chesterfield County records of the latter time period.  It is mentioned in land records as early as 1687, according to research on the Bratcher family (Margaret Bradshaw).

The nearby Powhite Parkway of the Richmond Metropolitan Authority (RMA) was named for the creek. The toll road (Virginia State Route 76) crosses over the creek and under the Norfolk Southern Railway near the former unincorporated town of Granite. About a mile north, the toll road crosses the river on a bridge just downstream from the mouth of the creek.

See also
List of rivers of Virginia

References

Rivers of Chesterfield County, Virginia
Rivers of Virginia
Tributaries of the James River
Rivers of Richmond, Virginia